Elena (Ileana) Săcălici-Petroşanu (1935–1959) was a  Romanian artistic gymnast who represented Romania at the 1956 Olympic Games. She was a member of the team that won the first team Olympic medal (1956) and of the team that won the first team world medal (1958) for Romania.

References

1935 births
1959 deaths
Gymnasts at the 1956 Summer Olympics
Olympic gymnasts of Romania
Olympic bronze medalists for Romania
Medalists at the World Artistic Gymnastics Championships
Romanian female artistic gymnasts
Olympic medalists in gymnastics
Medalists at the 1956 Summer Olympics
20th-century Romanian women